The Islamic Republic of Iran Army Ground Forces (Niroo-ye Zamini-ye Artesh-e Jomhuri-ye Eslâmi-ye Iran), acronymed NEZAJA (NEZEJA) are the ground forces of the Islamic Republic of Iran Army.

In Iran, it is also called Artesh, which is Persian for "army." In 2007, the regular Iranian Army was estimated to have 357,000 personnel (167,000 conscripts and 190,000 professionals) plus around 350,000 reservists for a total of 700,000 soldiers according to the CSIS. It is the 9th largest ground force in the world, the 9th largest armoured force globally and possesses the biggest Army Aviation fleet in the Middle East. Conscripts serve for 21 months and have professional military training.

Iran has two parallel land forces with some integration at the command level: the regular Artesh (Army), and the Islamic Revolutionary Guard Corps, also known as the Sepâh (IRGC).

History

Antiquity
A national army of sorts has existed in Iran since the establishment of the Persian Empire. National armies usually appeared throughout the country's points of strength, while in times of weakness mercenaries and conscript armies were recruited temporarily from fiefdoms. The original core of full-time troops and imperial body guards were called the Immortals, these were established in 580 BC by Cyrus the Great. These were replaced by the Junishapur Shâhanshâh (King of Kings) in the Sassanid Dynasty after a period of disunity and chaos in the country. Following the Islamic invasion of Iran and eventual resurgence of Iranian dynasties a new full-time army was formed by the name of Qezelbash in the Safavid dynasty. The Qajar period saw several attempts to re-model the traditional Iranian military based on western models. These were met with limited success at the time.

Pahlavi era

"In 1918 the Qajar armed forces consisted of four, separate, foreign-commanded military units. Several provincial and tribal forces could also be called on during an emergency, but their reliability was highly questionable. More often than not, provincial and tribal forces opposed the government's centralisation efforts, particularly because Tehran was perceived to be under the dictate of foreign powers. Having foreign officers in commanding positions over Iranian troops added to these tribal and religious concerns."

"Loyal, disciplined, and well trained, the most effective government unit was the 8,000-man Persian Cossack Brigade. It was created in 1879 and commanded by Russian Imperial Army officers until the 1917 Russian Revolution. After that date its command passed into Iranian hands, and the brigade represented the core of the new, Iranian armed forces. Swedish officers commanded the 8,400-man Gendarmerie, organised in 1911 as the first, internal security force. The 6,000-man South Persia Rifles was financed by Britain and commanded by British officers from its inception in 1916. Its primary task was to combat tribal forces allegedly stirred up by German agents during the First World War. The Qajar palace guard, the Nizam, commanded by a Swedish officer, was a force originally consisting of 2,000 men, although it deteriorated rapidly in numbers because of rivalries. Thus, during the First World War, the 24,400 troops in these four, separate, military units made up one of the weakest forces in Iranian history."

After the First World War, the army had shrunk, but not much on paper, ostentiably numbering 25,000 in total. By 1920 it consisted of the Persian Cossacks; the Gendarmerie, expanded from two regiments that had stayed loyal; and the South Persia Rifles and the regular army, reduced to the Central Brigade in Tehran, with a theoretical strength of 2,200.

Following the rise of the Pahlavi dynasty in 1925, the new, Imperial Iranian Army became a priority. By 1941, it stood at 125,000 troops—five times its original size—and was considered well trained and well equipped. However, the army was focused on internal security operations, rather than, Farrokh says 'fighting well-led and equipped Soviet and Western armies.' Ward writes that the 'army's sixteen divisions were spread across the country in their home garrisons, and only some of the western divisions had received any significant reinforcements of infantry and artillery. Maj. Gen. Hassan Mogaddam, the 5th Division commander, was put in charge of all western forces." The defence of the Khorramshahr-Ahvaz area was put under the navy's Rear Admiral Gholamali Bayandor, with his sailors plus a brigade of the army's 6th Division.

In August 1941 the Soviets and British launched the Anglo-Soviet invasion of Iran, which began on 25 August and lasted until 17 September. London and Moscow had insisted that the Shah expel Iran's large German population and allow shipments of war supplies to cross the country en route to the Soviet Union. Both of these proved unacceptable to Reza Shah; he was sympathetic to Germany, and Iran had declared its neutrality in the Second World War. Iran's location was so strategically important to the Allied war effort, however, that London and Moscow chose to violate Tehran's neutrality. From the south came the British Paiforce, under the command of Lieutenant-General Edward Quinan. Paiforce was made up of the 8th and 10th Indian Infantry Divisions, plus three other brigades. Meanwhile, the Soviets invaded from the north. Three armies, the 44th, 47th and 53rd Armies of the Transcaucasian Front under General Dmitry Timofeyevich Kozlov, occupied Iran's northern provinces.

Against the Allied forces, the army was overwhelmed in three days, while the fledgling Imperial Iranian Air Force and Imperial Iranian Navy suffered heavy damage. Conscripts deserted by the thousands. His institutional power base ruined, Reza Shah abdicated in favour of his young son, Mohammad Reza Shah Pahlavi. In the absence of a broad political power base and with a shattered army, Mohammad Reza Shah faced an almost impossible task of rebuilding. There was no popular sympathy for the army in view of the widespread and largely accurate perception that it was a brutal tool used to uphold a dictatorial regime. The young shah, distancing Tehran from the European military, in 1942, invited the United States to send a military mission to advise in the reorganisation effort. With American advice, emphasis was placed on quality rather than quantity.

The small but more confident army that resulted from American training was capable enough to participate in the 1946 campaign in Azarbaijan to put down a Soviet-inspired, separatist rebellion. During the three years of occupation, Stalin had expanded Soviet political influence in Azerbaijan and the Kurdish area in northwestern Iran. On 12 December 1945, after weeks of violent clashes, a Soviet-backed separatist People's Republic of Azerbaijan was founded. The Kurdish People's Republic was also established in late 1945. Iranian troops sent to re-establish control were blocked by Soviet Red Army units. When the deadline for withdrawal arrived on 2 March 1946, six months after the end of hostilities, the British began to withdraw, but Moscow refused, "citing threats to Soviet security," sparking the Iran crisis of 1946. Soviet troops did not withdraw from Iran proper until May 1946, following Iran's official complaint to the newly formed United Nations Security Council and intense pressure from the United States.

Unlike its 1925 counterpart, the 1946 Majlis was suspicious of the shah's plans for a strong army. Many members of the parliament feared that the army would once again be used as a source of political power. To curtail the shah's potential domination of the country, they limited his military budgets.

From the 1966-67 edition to the 1969-70 edition, the IISS Military Balance listed the Iranian Army with one armoured division, seven infantry divisions, and one independent armoured brigade. By the 1971-72 edition, two armoured divisions, five infantry divisions, the independent armoured brigade, and other independent brigades were listed. Within two years after that, the listing quickly changed to three armoured divisions and three infantry divisions.

Dramatic reforms brought in a host of western advisors and over the course of more than three decades the army was to become the world's fifth strongest by 1979. Throughout the 1970s the Imperial Iranian Ground Forces, as they were then known, underwent a rapid transformation and increase in strength. During this period, Iran established the "Imperial Iranian Army Aviation" (IIAA). It was mainly equipped with American aircraft types.

In the early 1970s the Sultan of Oman was fighting the Dhofar Rebellion with British support. As a result of Sultan Qaboos's diplomatic initiatives, the Shah sent a brigade of troops numbering 1,200 and with its own helicopters to assist the Sultan's Armed Forces in 1973. The Iranian brigade first secured the Salalah-Thumrait road. In 1974, the Iranian contribution was expanded into the Imperial Iranian Task Force, numbering 4,000. They attempted to establish another interdiction line, codenamed the "Damavand Line", running from Manston, a few miles east of Sarfait, to the coast near the border with South Yemen (the PDRY). Heavy rebel opposition, which included artillery fire from within South Yemen, thwarted this aim for several months. Eventually, the town of Rahkyut, which the PFLO had long maintained as the capital of their liberated territory, fell to the Iranian task force. The IITF remained in Oman in December 1975, then at a strength of 3,000.

The Library of Congress Country Studies volume for Iran issued in 1978 wrote that:

"During the 1970s ..the Imperial Iranian Ground Forces was undergoing a rapid increase in strength; that year [sic] it was a largely mechanized and armoured force of about 220,000. In late 1977 its former organization into three army corps, with headquarters in Kermanshah, Tehran, and Shiraz, was dropped; divisional commanders subsequently reported directly to the army commander. The army contained three armoured divisions, each with six tank battalions and five mechanised infantry battalions; four infantry divisions; four independent brigades (two infantry, one airborne and 1 special force); and the Army Aviation Command (one infantry division and one independent infantry brigade formed the Imperial Guard). These combat units.. were said to be 85 per cent operational, though some outside observers doubted this claim.
During the mid-1970s, fully 80 per cent of Iran's ground forces were deployed along the Iraqi border, though official sources maintained that a large portion could be sent anywhere in the country.. by means of air force transports. Troop deployment was expected to shift south in the late 1970s with the opening of the Chah Bahar facility."

"The rapidly growing Army Aviation Command, whose major operational facilities were located at Isfahan, was largely equipped with American aircraft, though some helicopters were of Italian manufacture. In 1977 army aviation operated some sixty light fixed-wing aircraft, though its strength lay in its fleet of some 700 combat helicopters."

Two years later, Gabriel listed the major formations of the Imperial Iranian Ground Forces in the final year of the Shah, 1979, as including the 16th (Hamadan), 81st, 88th (Zahedan/Chah Bahar), and 92nd Armored Divisions. Other data suggests one division was being organised in Sistan Baluchestan, presumably the 88th Armoured Division. He also listed three infantry divisions, the 2nd in Tehran, the 28th Infantry Division at Sanandaj, and the 77th Infantry Division at Mashad; two infantry brigades (the 64th at Mahabad and the 84th at Khorramabad), the 55th Airborne Brigade at Shiraz and the Special Forces Brigade HQ in Tehran.

Islamic Republic of Iran
Immediately after the 1979 revolution a series of purges gutted the core of the army's Western trained senior commanders. These included numerous executions ordered by Sadegh Khalkhali, the new Revolutionary Court judge. Between February and September 1979, Iran's government executed 85 senior generals and forced all major-generals and most brigadier-generals into early retirement. By September 1980, the government had purged 12,000 army officers. These purges resulted in a drastic decline in the Iranian military's operational capacities. Their regular army (which, in 1978, was considered the world's fifth most powerful) had been badly weakened. A shortage of spare parts for Iran's U.S.-made and British-made equipment began to cripple Iran's military forces. The desertion rate reached 60%, and the officer corps was devastated. The most highly skilled soldiers and aviators were exiled, imprisoned, or executed.

The last general to head the Imperial Iranian Army was General Gholam Ali Oveissi, who was assassinated in Paris along with his brother in 1984. He was replaced by General Abbas Gharebaghi, as armed forces chief of staff, who allied with the Islamic Republic and dismantled the Imperial Iranian Army, which was renamed the Islamic Republic of Iran Army.

The two Iranian Imperial Guard divisions were combined into the 21st Infantry Division.

The purges left the Army poorly prepared when Iraq invaded Iran at the beginning of the Iran–Iraq War. A Central Intelligence Agency assessment of 7 November 1979 said that Iranian military capabilities '..had not recovered significantly since the collapse of the armed forces in the February revolution. Ground forces capabilities remain limited despite some improvement in discipline and operational readiness in recent months.'

Iran–Iraq War

Iraq invaded Iran, beginning the Iran–Iraq War, on 22 September 1980. Throughout the war, Iran never managed to fully recover from the post-revolutionary flight of military personnel. Continuous sanctions prevented Iran from acquiring many heavy weapons, such as tanks and aircraft. When the invasion occurred, many pilots and officers were released from prison, or had their executions commuted to combat the Iraqis. In addition, many junior officers were promoted to generals, resulting in the army being more integrated as a part of the regime by the war's end, as it is today. Iran still had at least 1,000 operational tanks, and could cannibalize equipment to procure spare parts.

From July 1985, the IISS started attributing an estimated three army headquarters to the Iranian Army where previously no headquarters above division level has been identified. These were identified by other sources later as the 1st Army (HQ Kermanshah), 2nd Army (HQ Tehran) and 3rd Army (HQ Shiraz).

In 1987, and on the verge of the end of the Iran–Iraq War, the Artesh was organised as follows:
 Three mechanised divisions,
 Each of which composed of three armoured and six mechanised battalions organised into three brigades
 Seven infantry divisions (seemingly including the 21st, 64th and 77th Infantry Divisions),
 One special forces division composed of four brigades,
 One airborne brigade (55th Airborne Brigade?)
 One air support command,

and some independent armoured brigades including infantry and a "coastal force."

The war finally ended in 1988.

Post Iran–Iraq War
A new cadre of commanders, shaped by their experiences in the war, drastically reduced reliance on foreign supplied equipment and training. Following the war the military pursued a dramatic restructuring, much of it under total secrecy. While still only a mere shadow of its pre-revolutionary self, the Artesh rapidly re-asserted its abilities and started to grow again.

The IISS determined that at some point between 1992 and 1995 an additional army headquarters was raised (making a total of four). Later, some time between mid-1997 and mid-1999, the listing changed to that of four corps. The Jaffee Center's Middle East Military Balance 99-00 also lists the four corps the IISS had attributed.

Status in 2006/08
Jane's reported in 2006 that the Army was commanded via three army level headquarters with 15 divisions. The IISS reported in the Military Balance 2008 that there 12 Corps level regional headquarters, five armoured divisions with some independent brigades, seven infantry divisions with some independent brigades, one special forces brigade, two commando divisions with some independent brigades, plus an airborne brigade. There were also six artillery groups, and aviation forces. The number of divisions reported has not changed for some years. Often reported formations include the 23rd Special Forces Division, established in 1993–94, and the 55th Paratroop Division. Jane's Sentinel Security Assessments reports that the 23rd Special Forces Division is amongst the most professional formations in the Iranian Army, with at least 6,000 personnel, all of whom are believed to be regulars.

The regular armoured divisions, including the 92nd Armored Division, are sub-divided into three brigades.

Globalsecurity.org says on its page on the Iranian Army:

 "The regular army.. has a number of independent brigades and groups, though there is almost no reliable data on the size and number of these smaller independent formations. These include one logistics brigade, an infantry brigade, an airborne brigade, special forces (Takavar) brigades, and five artillery brigades/regiments. There are also coastal defence units, a growing number of air defence groups, between four and six army aviation units, and a growing number of logistics and supply formations."
 "There are a variety of other reports of doubtful veracity. Some sources claim that small light formations in the regular army include an Airmobile Forces Group created after the Iran–Iraq War. This formation is said to include the 29th Special Forces Division, which was formed in 1993-1994, and the 55th Paratroop Division. Other sources claim that the commando forces of the regular army and IRGC are integrated into a Corps of about 30,000 soldiers, with integrated helicopter lift and air assault capabilities. These airborne and special forces troops are said to train together at Shiraz."

Many of these assessments appear to be copyright violations from research conducted by the Burke Chair in Strategy at the Center for Strategic and International Studies, Washington DC, for example, an updated military balance report dated 2012.(see also CSIS Iran and Gulf Military Balance, 11 July 2012, p51

Most soldiers of the Iranian Army are well trained and determined, but their equipment is outdated or obsolete.  They primarily use outdated Western-style equipment or newer, locally produced equipment, which is lower quality.  Commanders generally appoint men to high level positions based on loyalty, rather than military skills.

Since 2010 Iranian Army has undergone a reorganization process called Thamen alaeme general structure plan (طرح جامع ساختاری ثامن الائمه), this plan includes transformation from a division-centered model towards a brigade-centered model, a re-positioning of Army bases, the adding of new units and an increase in mobility of existing army units. To that effect, it has sheered off some brigades from existing divisions as well as establishing new brigades alongside of them. By March 2012 31 new independent brigades have been established throughout the army.

The commander of the Iranian Army's Ground Forces is Brigadier General Kioumars Heydari.

Iranian Army Commissioned Officers and Enlisted Ranks

Officers

Enlisted

Equipment

Iran's main battle tanks include an estimated ~1500 or possibly more, indigenous Zulfiqar MBTs, 480 T-72S, 150 M-60A1s, 75 T-62s, 100 Chieftain Mk 3/Mk 5 MBTs, 540 T-54/T-55/Type 59s, and 150 M-47/M-48s.

The Zulfiqar is the defence industry of Iran's most recent main battle tank, named after the twin-pointed legendary sword of Ali. Born as the brainchild of Brigadier General Mir-Younes Masoumzadeh, deputy ground force commander for research and self-sufficiency of the armed forces, the vehicle has been developed from major components of the American M-60 tank. One of the features which has drawn the attention of the Defense Ministry is that indigenously-made parts have been used in it. The prototypes of the tank were tested in 1993. Six semi-industrial prototypes were produced and tested in 1997. The IISS estimates that around 150 Zulfiqar 1's are now in service.

The main attack helicopter of the Islamic Republic of Iran Army is the AH-1J Sea Cobra. The number of AH-1Js in service was estimated by the IISS in 2009 as 50, though 202 were delivered before the 1979 Iranian Revolution. Iran also operates an unknown number of the Panha 2091, which is an unlicensed, locally-made upgrade of the AH-1J.

The main transport helicopter of the Islamic Republic of Iran Army is the CH-47C Chinook. The number of CH-47Cs in service was estimated as 20 though 57 were delivered before the 1979 Iranian Revolution. Islamic Republic of Iran Army lost one of them in 2011.

Commanders 

|-
| colspan="7" align="center"| Commander of the Imperial Iranian Ground Force

|-
| colspan="7" align="center"| Commander of the Islamic Republic of Iran Army Ground Force

See also

 International armed forces/military rankings of Iran
 List of armies by country

References

  – includes army order of battle of 1978−79
  For sale by the Supt. of Docs., U.S. G.P.O. "Research completed October 1987."

Further reading
 Ervand Abrahamian, A History of Modern Iran, 2018
 Echo of Iran, "Iran Almanac and Book of Facts," annual, 1961-1970 (1970 was ninth edition). Lists divisions; 1966 edition lists Imperial Guard Brigade; 2nd Division Tabriz; 3rd Division Azarbaijan; 4th Div Rezaiyeh; 5th Div Gorgon; 8th Div Ahwaz; and Mashad Division.
 Kaveh Farrokh, Iran at War: 1500-1988, Osprey Hardcover, released 24 May 2011; .
 Gregory F. Rose, The Post-Revolutionary Purge of Iran's Armed Forces: A Revisionist Assessment, Iranian Studies, Vol. 17, No. 2/3 (Spring – Summer, 1984), pp. 153–194.
 Ẕukāʼ, Yaḥyá, The Imperial Iranian Army from Cyrus to Pahlavi, Imperial Iranian Armed Forces Committee for the Celebration of the 2,500th Anniversary of the Founding of the Persian Empire, 1970.
 Peter Oborne and David Morrison, A Dangerous Delusion, 2013. Review by Michael Axworthy, The Daily Telegraph, 27 Apr 2013.
 Lieutenant Colonel A. Pavlov, "Iran's Ground Forces," Zarubezhnoye Voyennoye Obozreniye, no. 10 (October 1987), translated in Joint Publications Research Service-UFM-88-003, May 9, 1988, 13.
 Sepehr Zabir, The Iranian Military in Revolution and War (RLE Iran D), First Published 1988; eBook Published 27 April 2012, Routledge, London. DOI The Iranian Military in Revolution and War (RLE Iran D)
 Donald N. Wilbur, "Iran Past and Present," Princeton University Press, 1963 – p. 147 describes up to six corps and multiple divisions.

External links 
 CSIS, Iran and the Gulf Military Balance: Conventional and Asymmetric Dimensions, revised 6 January 2013

Military of Iran